Strathfield is a rural locality in the Isaac Region, Queensland, Australia. In the  Strathfield had a population of 8 people.

Geography 
The Peak Downs Highway passes through the locality from the south-west to the east. The Fitzroy Developmental Road runs south from the Peak Downs Highway. The Goonyella railway line passes through the locality from south-west to south-east with the Hall Creek branch line splitting off and proceeding through the locality and to the west. These railways serve two coal mines in the locality, Peabody Coppabella coal mine and BHP Billition Mitsui South Walker Creek coal mine.

Bee Creek and Copper Creek flow through the locality from the north to the south-east, eventually becoming tributaries of the Isaac River, which ultimately flows into the Fitzroy River to the Coral Sea.

History 
Named and bounded by the Minister for Natural Resources 12/03/1999. Regazetted by the Minister for Natural Resources, Mines and Energy and Minister for Trade on the 10 September 2010 due to the council amalgamations under the Local Government Reform Impl

In the  Strathfield had a population of 8 people.

References 

Isaac Region
Localities in Queensland